Sympistis saxatilis is a species of moth in the family Noctuidae (the owlet moths). It is found in North America.

The MONA or Hodges number for Sympistis saxatilis is 10042.2.

References

Further reading

 
 
 

saxatilis
Articles created by Qbugbot
Moths described in 1999